Arthur David Scott (born December 26, 1953) is a former American football offensive lineman who played professionally in the National Football League (NFL) for the Atlanta Falcons.  He played college football at the University of Kansas.

References

1953 births
Living people
American football offensive guards
Atlanta Falcons players
Kansas Jayhawks football players
Sportspeople from Hackensack, New Jersey
Players of American football from Paterson, New Jersey